Cicero Francis Lowe House is a historic home located at Winston-Salem, Forsyth County, North Carolina.  It was designed by architect Willard C. Northup and built in 1911.  It is a two-story, Colonial Revival style frame dwelling.  It features high chimneys with decorative caps, a high hipped roof, and a classical entrance with projecting semi-circular porch and Ionic order columns.

It was listed on the National Register of Historic Places in 1984.

References

Houses on the National Register of Historic Places in North Carolina
Colonial Revival architecture in North Carolina
Houses completed in 1911
Houses in Winston-Salem, North Carolina
National Register of Historic Places in Winston-Salem, North Carolina